Barry Griffiths may refer to:

 Barri Griffiths, ring name of Mason Ryan (born 1982), Welsh wrestler and former Gladiators competitor
 Barry Griffiths (Australian footballer) (born 1929), Australian rules footballer
 Barry Griffiths (footballer, born 1940), association football goalkeeper
 Barry Griffiths (table tennis) (born 1964), New Zealand table tennis player
 Barry Griffiths (violinist) (1939–2020), British violinist